Heydarabad (also Romanized as Ḩeydarābād; also known as Khairābād, Kheir Abad, and Kheyrābād) is a village in Mashiz Rural District, in the Central District of Bardsir County, Kerman Province, Iran. At the 2006 census, its population was 72, in 18 families.

References 

Populated places in Bardsir County